Clement Pearson Simpson OBE (13 June 1868  – 19 September 1948) was an English rugby union forward who was a member of the British Isles XV that toured South Africa in 1891.

Personal history
Simpson was born in 1868 to John Simpson of Claverton Street, Pimlico in London. He was educated at Wellington College, Berkshire, before gaining entry to Trinity College, Cambridge in 1887. He received his Bachelor of Arts in 1891, and in 1896 was admitted as a solicitor. He practiced in London from 1900.

Rugby career
Simpson first came to note as a rugby player when he was chosen to represent Cambridge University; and earned a single sporting 'Blue' as part of the Cambridge team in The Varsity Match of 1890. The same year he completed his university education, Simpson was invited, along with several other Cambridge players, to join Bill Maclagan's British Isles team on a tour of South Africa. Simpson played ten matches over the tour, but was only selected for one Test match. Simpson's one and only international cap was the First Test against South Africa, which was played at Port Elizabeth, the tourists winning 4-0.

On his return from South Africa, Simpson joined Richmond Rugby Club, and in 1893 was selected to play for invitational touring team, the Barbarians.

Notes

References
 
 

1868 births
1948 deaths
Alumni of Trinity College, Cambridge
Barbarian F.C. players
British & Irish Lions rugby union players from England
Cambridge University R.U.F.C. players
English rugby union players
Officers of the Order of the British Empire
People educated at Wellington College, Berkshire
Rugby union forwards
Rugby union players from London